Light and Shade may refer to:
 Light + Shade, a 2005 two-disc album by English musician Mike Oldfield
 Light and Shade (This Ascension album), 1991
 Light and Shade (Fra Lippo Lippi album), 1987

See also
 Lights and Shadows (disambiguation)